The 1998 IAAF Combined Events Challenge was the first edition of the annual competition for decathletes and heptathletes, organised by the world's governing body IAAF.

Men's ranking

References
 decathlon2000

Combined Events Challenge
1998